The 1933-34 French Rugby Union Championship 1933-34 was won by Bayonne that beat Biarritz  in the final.

The tournament was played by 54 clubs divided in six pool of nine and after in two pool of three. The winner of these two pools met in the final.

Final

External links 
Compte rendu de la finale de 1934, sur lnr.fr

1934
France|France
Championship